Abu Khalid al-Suri (Abu Khalid 'the Syrian'), or Mohamed al-Bahaiya or Abu Umayr al-Shami, was a Syrian jihadist militant often affiliated with Osama Bin Laden’s al-Qaeda and the Syrian Islamist group Ahrar al-Sham. Al-Suri was believed to be assassinated by an ISIL suicide attack in 2014, however ISIL denied involvement in the attack.

Militant activity
Born in Aleppo, Syria, in 1963 as Mohamed al-Bahaiya, al-Suri's jihadist career has its roots in the failed Islamist uprising in Syria between 1979 and 1982, following which he fled Syria.

During the 1990s al-Suri coordinated closely with Abu-Musab al-Suri, a Spanish-Syrian jihadist. Together they worked to establish jihadi volunteer centers, training camps and various media groups in Afghanistan. While both men worked closely with Bin Laden and al-Qaeda, they denied being members of al-Qaeda in a statement made in 1999. Around the time of the statement, al-Suri had been operating mostly out of Turkey and fled to Afghanistan.

In 2004, al-Suri and Abu-Musab were linked to the 2004 Madrid bombing through a series of money transfers and personal contacts. A Spanish court document went on to name al-Suri as Bin Laden's "courier" in Europe.

Al-Suri was financially aided partly by Abd Al-Rahman al-Nuaimi, a Qatari national. Nuaimi is a purported human rights activist and co-founder of Alkarama. On December 18, 2013, Nuaimi was placed on the United States Treasury's Specially Designated Global Terror List (SDTG). Nuaimi is accused of transferring $600,000 dollars to al-Suri and the intent to transfer approximately $50,000 more.

Involvement in the Syrian Civil War and Ahrar al-Sham
In 2011, al-Suri co-founded Ahrar al-Sham, a Sunni Syrian Islamist group, opposing Bashar al-Assad's government forces as part of the Islamic Front. Despite helping to found al-Sham and serving in its most senior ranks, al-Suri's involvement in the organization and his ties to al-Qaeda were kept secret, and he adopted a new nom de guerre: Abu Omeir al-Shami. Al Suri continued to use both names separately in statements, but it was not until after his death that the two were linked as the same person.

In early 2013 infighting began between al-Qaeda's al-Nusra Front and ISIL (then known only as ISI). It began with a recorded announcement on April 8 by ISI's leader Abu Bakr al-Baghdadi announcing an unauthorized merger between the two groups. Disagreements and conflicts between the two escalated by the end of 2013. Hostilities continued to worsen, with al-Nusra's leader, Abu Mohammed al-Julani, claiming in a 2014 interview that he saw no end to the conflict. 
 
In May 2013, the leader of al-Qaeda, Ayman al-Zawahiri, sent a secret letter to al-Baghdadi in the hopes of quelling tensions between their two groups. The letter, dated 23 May 2013, asserts al-Qaeda's dominance and names al-Suri as al-Zawahiri's representative and delegate in Syria.

Abu Musab al-Zarqawi, Abu Musab al-Suri, Abdullah Azzam, Ayman al-Zawahiri, and Osama bin Laden were cited by Abu Khalid when he addressed ISIL.

Assassination
On February 23, 2014, five men entered al-Suri's headquarter compound in Aleppo and opened fire, then one of the gunman detonated his explosive pack. The attack killed al-Suri and six of his men.

Syrian rebels mourned al-Suri's death on social media accounts, posting his photo and praising his actions in support of jihad. Al-Qaeda published a eulogy for al-Suri and uploaded a video of him at the al-Farouq training camp in Afghanistan, along with photos of him with Bin Laden.

A rebel source was quoted saying "Sheikh Abu Khalid was an important Jihadi figure, he fought the Americans in Iraq and in Afghanistan. They (ISIL) gave the Americans a present, a free gift, by killing him."

Abu Khalid received condolences from Nusra Front member Abu Sulayman al Muhajir.

Abu Khalid was praised by the Mujahideen Shura Council in the Environs of Jerusalem's media branch Ibn Taymiyya Media Center.

Abu Khalid received condolences from Al-Qaeda leader Ayman al-Zawahiri. Abu Firas al-Suri and Abu Khalid were praised in an Al-Qaeda video released by al-Zawahiri called "Three Sheikhs of Jihad".

Abu Khalid appeared in photos with Ahrar ash-Sham chief Hassan Abboud. A photo of Abu Khaled al-Suri, Hassan Abboud, and Abu Firas al-Suri was released.

Abu Khaled al-Suri was mentioned by Abu Firas al-Suri in a Nusra video which released more information on Abu Firas, such as his previous Muslim Brotherhood affiliation and his association with bin Laden and Abdullah Azzam.

References

External links
http://www.longwarjournal.org/tags/abu-khalid-al-suri

1963 births
2014 deaths
People from Aleppo
Syrian Islamists
People of the Islamic uprising in Syria
Syrian exiles
Assassinated Syrian people
People killed in the Syrian civil war
Syrian al-Qaeda members
Syrian Salafis
Salafi jihadists
Assassinated al-Qaeda leaders
Leaders of Islamic terror groups